Spinomantis massi is a species of frog in the mantellid subfamily Mantellinae. It is endemic to the humid forests of northwestern Madagascar.

Taxonomy
This species was described in the genus Mantidactylus, subgenus Spinomantis, by Frank Glaw and Miguel Vences in 1994. The species is named massi to congratulate the daughter of Frank Glaw, Andrea Mass née Glaw, and her husband Robert Mass, on their marriage. Therefore, plural form massorum should have been used, but this is considered an unjustified emendation. The correct specific name is therefore massi.

Description
Adult males measure  in snout–vent length (SVL); the only known adult female measured . The head is wider than long. The tympanum is distinct. The fingers and toes bear enlarged, triangular disks. Males have a subgular vocal sac.

Habitat and ecology
It is an arboreal species that breeds in streams. It is threatened by habitat loss caused by subsistence agriculture, timber extraction, charcoal manufacture, the spread of invasive eucalyptus, and expanding human settlements.

References

massi
Endemic frogs of Madagascar
Amphibians described in 1994
Taxa named by Frank Glaw
Taxa named by Miguel Vences
Taxonomy articles created by Polbot